Orian M. "Toad" Landreth (June 21, 1904 – October 20, 1996) was an American football coach. He was the head football coach at the University of Arizona in 1938, compiling a record of 3–6.

Head coaching record

College

References

External links
 

1904 births
1996 deaths
Arizona Wildcats football coaches
High school football coaches in  California
Junior college football coaches in the United States
Sportspeople from Long Beach, California